Dendrothrix is a plant genus of the family Euphorbiaceae first described as a genus in 1996. It is native to southern Venezuela and northwestern Brazil.

Species
 Dendrothrix multiglandulosa Esser - Amazonas State in Venezuela
 Dendrothrix wurdackii Esser - Amazonas State in Brazil
 Dendrothrix yutajensis (Jabl.) Esser - Amazonas State in Brazil; Amazonas & Bolívar States in Venezuela

References

Hippomaneae
Flora of South America
Euphorbiaceae genera